Guy Le Baube (born 1944) is a Franco-American fashion and art photographer. He was born in France and moved from Paris to New York in 1976. His work has appeared in magazines such as Vogue, Harper's Bazaar, Elle, and Marie Claire. Guy Le Baube is the son of the French painter Claude Le Baube.

Exhibitions 

 July, 2021- "Art is Life" Avant Gallery, New York City, USA
 July, 2019- "Behind the Scenes" Avant Gallery, New York City, USA
 Opera Gallery, Manhattan, United States of America
 August,2019 -Avant Gallery, New York, USA
 2012 -Art Paris 
 August, 2008-Opera Gallery, Monaco
 March,2006- Miami, Florida, USA
 November, 2005- Geneva
 August, 2005-Gstaad

Notable Artwork 

 Rue Bois Le Vent, 1971 
 Le sommier, 1977
 Culotte, 1978
 Wool, 1979
 Canape, 1979
 Reading,1986
 St. Jean Cap Ferrat, 1986
 Tea or coffee, 1990
 Donald Duck, 1990
 Shaving Smoking, 1994
 Rachel Cooking, 1994
 Bust, 1994
 War widow, 1997
 Bomb, 1999
 Window, 2002
 Dogs, 2002
 Loving Mom, 2002
 Love, 2002
 Afternoon, 2002
 Eyelashes, 2005
 Tattoo, 2007
 Fishnet, 2007
 Ready Made French Maid, 2007
 Readymade swimmer, 2008
 Readymade French navy, 2008
 Ascenseur social, 2010
 Hommage à Delacroix Liberté, 2011
 Crazyhorse private show 1, 2011
 Crazyhorse private show 5, 2011
 Titanic Resurrected, 2012
 Iceskater, 2012
 Marines, 2013
 Cupidon, 2013
 Flamingo Spear, 2013
 Mari Rouge, 2013

References

External links
 http://www.readytonavigate.com/
 http://www.louise-alexander.com/
 Guy Le Baube | Artnet

1944 births
Living people
French photographers
Date of birth missing (living people)